Le Linleu is a mountain in the Chablais Alps on the Swiss-French border. Towards the Swiss side, it displays a towering wall of several hundred meters, but it is easily accessible from the French side via a marked hiking path. It offers a beautiful circular panorama featuring the Diablerets, Dents du Midi and Cornettes de Bise.

References

External links
Le Linleu on Summitpost
Description on Randalp (french)

Mountains of the Alps
Mountains of Valais
Mountains of Haute-Savoie
France–Switzerland border
International mountains of Europe
Mountains of Switzerland
Two-thousanders of Switzerland